David Adams Riddell (30 September 1899 — 3 April 1957) was a Scottish first-class cricketer.

Riddell was born at Glasgow in September 1899. He was educated at Fettes College, before matriculating to St John's College, Cambridge. He served during the First World War with the Machine Gun Corps, being commissioned as a temporary second lieutenant in October 1918, less than one month before the end of the war. A club cricketer for Greenock, Riddell made three appearances in first-class cricket for Scotland in 1921 and 1922, playing twice against Ireland and once against Surrey. He scored 56 runs in his three matches, at an average of 11.20, with a highest score of 32. Riddell later emigrated to Australia, where he died in the inner-Melbourne suburb of Fitzroy in April 1957.

References

External links
 

1899 births
1957 deaths
Cricketers from Glasgow
People educated at Fettes College
Alumni of St John's College, Cambridge
Machine Gun Corps officers
British Army personnel of World War I
Scottish cricketers
Scottish emigrants to Australia